Chang Ya-juo (died 1942) was the mistress of Chiang Ching-kuo and bore twin sons for him, John Chiang and Winston Chang. She was born in Jiujiang and met Chiang when she was working at a training camp for enlistees in the fight against Japan while he was serving as the head of Gannan Prefecture.

The twins took their mother's surname. Chang Ya-jo died under mysterious circumstances; after dining at a friend's house, she came home complaining of stomach cramps. She was admitted to the hospital in Guilin and died the next day.

After their mother's death, the twins were raised by Chang's brother and sister-in-law, Chang Hau-juo and Chi Chen, respectively, who were officially listed as their parents. They escaped to Taiwan with their uncle and aunt in 1949 and settled near Hsinchu.

After a legal process that included obtaining written declarations from Chi's sons, documents attesting to the father-sons relationship between Chiang Ching-kuo and the twins from retired general Wang Sheng, the birth certificate listing Chang Ya-juo as his mother and DNA testing to prove that Chi was not his birth mother, John Chiang was able to obtain a new ID card listing Chiang Ching-kuo and Chang Ya-juo as his biological parents in December 2002. John Chiang officially changed his surname to Chiang in March 2005.

In 2006, Chiang stated he knew the identity of his mother's murderer, to be revealed as one of Chiang Ching-kuo's aides in his forthcoming memoirs, but that Chiang Ching-kuo had not ordered the murder and was not aware it was to take place.

Notes and references

Notes

References

External links
 

Year of birth missing
Place of birth missing
1942 deaths
Chiang Kai-shek family
People from Nanchang
Chinese murder victims